"Linda" is a popular song written, taking its name from then-one-year-old Linda McCartney. It was written by Jack Lawrence and published in 1946.

Composition 
The song was written in 1942 when Lawrence was in the service during World War II, taking its name from the then one-year-old daughter of his attorney, Lee Eastman. (His daughter was Linda Eastman McCartney, future first wife of the Beatle Paul McCartney.)

The song did not get published until after Lawrence left the military, and was then recorded by a number of performers, but the biggest hit was by Ray Noble's orchestra (with a vocal by Buddy Clark). Other charted versions were by Charlie Spivak (vocal by Tommy Mercer); Paul Weston (vocal by Matt Dennis); and by Larry Douglas.

Recordings
The recording by Ray Noble and Buddy Clark was recorded on November 15, 1946, and released by Columbia Records. It first reached the Billboard charts on March 21, 1947, and lasted thirteen weeks on the chart, peaking at number one.

The recording by Charlie Spivak was recorded on November 19, 1946, and released by RCA Victor Records. It first reached the Billboard charts on March 28, 1947, and lasted nine weeks on the chart, peaking at number six.

In 1962 Jan & Dean did a version of the song for Liberty Records that reached #28 on the Billboard Hot 100. Their next song, the #1 Surf City, made them a Surf Duo but their previous work was primarily doo-wop/Teen appeal.

Namesake 
Note: There is another song titled "Linda", written by Ann Ronell for the film score of The Story of G.I. Joe (1945). It was nominated for an Oscar.

Recorded versions
  
Marcus Belgrave
Sam Butera
Jimmy Clanton
Perry Como – for his album Como Swings (1959)
Priscilla Cory performed the song in the movie Deadman's Curve, the story based on Jan and Dean in 1978. Priscilla is the great grand daughter of inventor Nathan B. Stubblefield.
Bing Crosby – sang the song on three occasions on his radio show in 1947.
King Curtis
Dennis Day
Dale Hawkins
Jan and Dean – Jan & Dean Take Linda Surfin''' (1963).
Willie Nelson
Ray Noble and His Orchestra (Buddy Clark vocal)
Paul Petersen
Jim Reeves – Girls I Have Known (1958).
Line Renaud
Frank Rosolino
Bob Scobey
Frank Sinatra
Jerry Vale – I Remember Buddy'' (1958).
Adam Wade

References

External links
The story behind the song

1942 songs
1963 singles
Songs written by Jack Lawrence (songwriter)
Jan and Dean songs